Ivan Vladislavić (born 17 September 1957) is a South African author, editor and professor. Vladislavić's style has been described as postmodern, innovative, humorous and unpredictable. Despite receiving critical acclaim, his work is not well known outside his home country.

Biography 
Vladislavić was born in Pretoria in 1957. His father was a mechanic of Croatian heritage and his mother was a housewife. He attended the University of the Witwatersrand and graduated in 1979.

He has worked as Social Studies Editor for anti-apartheid publishing house Ravan Press and as an editor for Staffrider magazine.

He lives in Johannesburg, South Africa and is a Professor of Creative Writing at the University of the Witwatersrand.

Bibliography

Novels (fiction) 
The Folly (1993; Archipelago Books, 2015; And Other Stories, 2015)
The Restless Supermarket (David Krut Publishing, 2001; And Other Stories, 2014)
 The Exploded View (Random House, 2004, 2017; Archipelago Books, 2017)
 Double Negative (2011; And Other Stories, 2013)
 Originally published in a joint project, alongside 300 photos from photographer David Goldblatt, under the title TJ/Double Negative (2010)
 A Labour of Moles (2012)
 Illustrated novella designed by Sunandini Banerjee
 The Distance (2019; Archipelago Books, 2020)

Collections 

 Missing Persons (1989)
 Propaganda by Monuments and Other Stories (1996)
 Flashback Hotel: Early Stories (2010; Archipelago Books, 2019)
 101 Detectives (2015; And Other Stories, 2015)

Essays & Nonfiction 
Willem Boshoff (David Krut Publishing, 2004), extended essay on the work of conceptual artist Willem Boshoff
Portrait with Keys (2006)
The Loss Library (2012) 
A hybrid work blending "essay, fiction and literary genealogy"

Interviews

Steyn, Jan, "Interview with Ivan Vladislavić," The White Review, August 2012 
De Kok, Ingrid, "Ivan Vladislavić: The Restless Supermarket," World Literature Today, January 2002
De Vries, Fred, "Joburg’s ambiguity mirrored in Portrait," The Weekender, 9 September 2006
Jooste, Pamela, "In Conversation with Ivan Vladislavić," LitNet, March 2005 
Warnes, Christopher, "Interview with Ivan Vladislavić," Modern fiction studies, 46 (1) Spring, 2000: pp 280.
Interview with Ivan Vladislavić on The Ledge, an independent platform for world literature. Includes excerpt and audio.

Awards and honors

1991: Olive Schreiner Prize, Missing Persons
1993: CNA Literary Award, The Folly
1994: Thomas Pringle Prize, "Propaganda by Monuments" and "The WHITES ONLY Bench"
1997: Honorable Mention, Noma Award for Publishing in Africa, "Propaganda by Monuments"
2002: Sunday Times Fiction Prize, The Restless Supermarket
2007: Sunday Times Alan Paton Award for Nonfiction, Portrait with Keys
2007: University of Johannesburg Prize, Portrait with Keys
2009: Long-listed, Warwick Prize for Writing, Portrait with Keys
2011: University of Johannesburg Prize, Double Negative
2011: M-Net Literary Awards, Double Negative
2015: Windham–Campbell Literature Prize for Fiction, valued at $150,000

References

External links
Ivan Vladislvić by Katie Kitamura  Bomb

1957 births
Living people
South African male novelists
People from Pretoria
South African people of Croatian descent
South African male short story writers
South African short story writers
South African non-fiction writers
Male non-fiction writers